California 26th congressional district is a congressional district in the U.S. state of California currently represented by .

The district is located on the South Coast, comprising most of Ventura County as well as a small portion of Los Angeles County. Cities in the district include Camarillo, Oxnard, Santa Paula, Thousand Oaks, Westlake Village, Moorpark, and part of Simi Valley. In 2022, the district lost Ojai and most of Ventura and added Calabasas, Agoura Hills, and the sparsely populated northern half of Ventura County.

From 2003 to 2013, the district spanned the foothills of the San Gabriel Valley from La Cañada Flintridge to Rancho Cucamonga. David Dreier, a Republican, represented the district during this period.

Recent election results from statewide races

List of members representing the district

Election results

1952

1954

1956

1958

1960

1962

1964

1965 (Special)

1966

1968

1970

1972

1974

1976

1978

1980

1982

1984

1986

1988

1990

1992

1994

1996

1998

2000

2002

2004

2006

2008

2010

2012

2014

2016

2018

2020

Election results for special elections

2003 Special Election

Recall of Gray Davis
 67.8%	YES
 32.1% NO

Governor's Race
 20.3% for Cruz Bustamante (D)
 14.2% for Tom McClintock (R)
 61.1% for Arnold Schwarzenegger (R)

2005 Special Election

Proposition 73
Parental notification before termination of minors' pregnancy. 
 55.0% YES
 45.0% NO

Proposition 77
Redistricting according to a panel of retired judges. 
 49.8% YES
 50.2% NO

Proposition 80
Regulation of electric grids and services through California. 
 32.1% YES
 67.9% NO

Historical district boundaries

See also
List of United States congressional districts

References

External links
Official Congresswoman Julia Brownley website — representing the 26th District of California.
GovTrack.us: California's 26th congressional district
RAND California Election Returns: District Definitions
California Voter Foundation map — CD26

26
Government of Los Angeles County, California
Government of Ventura County, California
Camarillo, California
Conejo Valley
Fillmore, California
Moorpark, California
Newbury Park, California
Oak Park, California
Oxnard, California
Santa Clara River (California)
Santa Paula, California
Simi Valley, California
Thousand Oaks, California
Ventura, California
Westlake Village, California
Constituencies established in 1953
1953 establishments in California
Los Padres National Forest